Heidi Elgaard Johansen (born 9 June 1983) is a Danish retired football goalkeeper who played for OB Odense, Fortuna Hjørring and the Danish national team.

Johansen was the Danish Women's Player of the Year in 2002.

References
Danish Football Union (DBU) statistics

1983 births
Living people
Danish women's footballers
Denmark women's international footballers
Fortuna Hjørring players
Odense Q players
2007 FIFA Women's World Cup players
Women's association football goalkeepers